Katun is a rural locality (a settlement) in Aysky Selsoviet, Altaysky District, Altai Krai, Russia. The population was 272 as of 2013. There are 11 streets.

Geography 
Katun is located on the Katun River, 48 km east of Altayskoye (the district's administrative centre) by road. Rybalka is the nearest rural locality.

References 

Rural localities in Altaysky District, Altai Krai